Mikołajewice may refer to the following places:
Mikołajewice, Greater Poland Voivodeship (west-central Poland)
Mikołajewice, Pabianice County in Łódź Voivodeship (central Poland)
Mikołajewice, Sieradz County in Łódź Voivodeship (central Poland)
Mikołajewice, Silesian Voivodeship (south Poland)